Zalmay Wesa
(1947) is an Afghan politician. Previously Governor of eastern Paktia Province, he was appointed Governor of Kandahar Province in May 2017 when the previous governor, Humayun Azizi, was injured in the January 2017 Afghanistan bombings.

Zalmai Wesa was born in 1947 in Arghandab, Kandahar, and is the elder brother of Toryalai Wesa, a former governor of Kandahar Province. He is a member of the Afghan communist Khalq Party and received his military education in Moscow in the late 1980s. In 2013 he held the rank of Major General with the 209th Corps.

Wesa was wounded in an assassination attempt by a bodyguard in October 2018, and was erroneously reported dead. The attack killed Abdul Raziq Achakzai, the police chief of Kandahar. The Taliban later claimed responsibility.

References

External links

Governors of Kandahar Province
Governors of Paktia Province
Pashtun people
People from Kandahar
Afghan expatriates in Russia
1947 births
Living people
Politicians of Kandahar Province